George Peter Smith (August 12, 1873 – November 29, 1942) was a politician and former Minister of the Crown from Alberta, Canada. He was born in Lieury, Ontario and came west in 1901 while working for an insurance company.

Move West
After visiting Duhamel (a mission settlement southwest of Camrose, Alberta), Smith bought the local Trading Store in 1902. A well-respected Cree man named Pe-o-kis introduced Smith to other influential settlers like Francois Adam and Camille Miquelon. Smith formed good relationships with the Métis of the Laboucane Settlement and the Saulteaux peoples and developed a lucrative fur-trading business. He brought the largest known number of furs to be traded in Edmonton, amounting to 123,000 pelts. When a new CPR line was being built from Wetaskiwin to the village of Sparling (later Camrose), Smith anticipated the growth of the village and opened a store in Sparling. He is credited with suggesting the town's new name, when it changed to Camrose in 1905. In late 1908, Smith launched the Camrose Canadian newspaper, which exists to this day. As a founding father and booster of Camrose, Smith did much to promote the town and the surrounding region. He was responsible for the opening of Alberta's second Normal School in Camrose in 1915.

Political career
Smith first ran for election to the Alberta Legislature in the 1909 Alberta general election winning the new Camrose district with a comfortable plurality. He was a big promoter of immigration while in office.

Smith was re-elected in a landslide to a second term in office during the 1913 Alberta general election significantly increasing his plurality from last time.

He would be re-elected to his third and final term in the Alberta Legislature in the 1917 Alberta general election. This time with a slightly reduced majority of votes.

On August 26, 1918, he would be appointed to the Minister of Education portfolio. Smith held the post until he was defeated in the 1921 Alberta general election by Vernor W. Smith from the United Farmers of Alberta, the two Smiths were not related.

Prosecution
The United Farmers government in prosecuted Smith in 1926. The issue arose from a question Robert Marshall had asked in the legislature in regards to $5,820.00 that had been plundered from the Alberta Treasury in September 1921 by Smith. The government claimed it had no political motive in prosecuting Smith. The United Farmers government had Smith charged with fraud as they believed that the money which was taken from the treasury to pay Esdale Press Ltd. for services rendered.

Federal candidacy
Smith would attempt to run for a seat in the House of Commons of Canada in the 1935 Canadian federal election. He would be badly defeated by Social Credit candidate James Alexander Marshall.

References

External links

Legislative Assembly of Alberta Members Listing

Smith, George Peter
Candidates in the 1935 Canadian federal election
Alberta Liberal Party MLAs
Year of death missing
Members of the Executive Council of Alberta
Liberal Party of Canada candidates for the Canadian House of Commons
Education ministers of Alberta